Irvine Lake is a reservoir in Orange County, California, United States.  It is on Santiago Creek, located in Silverado, California, east of the city of Irvine and close to Irvine Regional Park. The reservoir is currently operated by the Serrano Water District and OC Parks.

Access to the lake is via Santiago Canyon Road, the road leading from Orange to Silverado. The Cleveland National Forest is on the northeast side of the lake.

History
The lake is formed by the Santiago Dam at the lake's north end, which was built between 1929 and 1931, and was originally called the Santiago Reservoir. The dam was built by the Irvine Company and the Serrano Water District (known as Serrano Irrigation District at the time); it is now owned by the Serrano Water District and the Irvine Ranch Water District and operated by Serrano Water District in conjunction with OC Parks. The lake provides drinking water to Villa Park and some parts of Orange, and provides supplementary irrigation water to neighboring ranches.

Stocked with largemouth bass, catfish, trout, and crappie, the lake fishery opened to the public in 1941. The land around the lake is owned by the Irvine Company, which leases the fishing, boating, and camping concessions to SWD Recreation Inc.

The lake had not been full from 2011 onward due to an extended drought, and its levels had been steadily decreasing for years. In September 2016, it was at 13 percent of capacity. By August 2019, the lake was naturally refilled due to an unusual amount of rain. The amount of area covered in water went from 2,700 acre-feet to 15,715 acre-feet in a one year span.

In 2016, Irvine Lake was closed to the public due to financial disagreements between the Serrano Water District and the Irvine Company. In August 2019, the lake was successfully reopened to the public for shore fishing and other activities after OC Parks, the Serrano Water District, and the Irvine Company came to a one-year agreement to resume operations.

See also 
List of lakes in California

References

External links 

IRWD's page on Irvine Lake
SWD's page on Irvine Lake
Recreational information, the website of the concessionaire

Parks in Orange County, California
Santa Ana River
Reservoirs in Orange County, California
Recreational fishing in the United States
Reservoirs in California
Reservoirs in Southern California